Galland is a surname. Notable people with the surname include:

 Adolf Galland (1912–1996), German air general during World War II
 Antoine Galland (1646–1715), French orientalist and archeologist; first European translator of The Arabian Nights
 Antoine Galland (1763–1851), publisher and printer during the French Revolution and First Empire
 Bertha Galland (1876–1932), American stage actress
 Edward Galland, triplet profiled in the 2018 documentary film Three Identical Strangers
 Jean Galland (1887–1967), French film actor
 Bruno Galland (born 1964), French medievalist
 Jérémie Galland (born 1983), French cyclist
 Jordan Galland, American entertainer
 Pierre-Victor Galland (1822–1892), French decorative painter
 Stéphane Galland (born 1969), Belgian drummer
Wilhelm-Ferdinand Galland (1914–1943), German World War II fighter pilot 
 Yves Galland (born 1941), French politician and entrepreneur

Fictional
 Adolfine Galland, fictional character in the anime/manga Strike Witches

See also
 Groupe Galland, Canadian bus operator